FPC may refer to:

Government 
 Federal Power Commission, a regulatory agency of the United States federal government
 Federal Prison Camp, part of the United States Federal Bureau of Prisons
Federal Police Commission, federal law enforcement agency in Ethiopia
 Financial Policy Committee, of the Bank of England
 Forest Products Commission, a agency of the government of Western Australia

Political parties 
 Comorian Popular Front, in Comoros
 Patriotic Front for Change, in Burkina Faso

Sport 
 Colombian Professional Football
 Fred Page Cup, a Canadian hockey competition
 Portuguese Cycling Federation

Technology 
 Factory production control
 Fast Patrol Craft
 Flexible printed circuit
 Free Pascal Compiler

Other uses 
 Federal Passenger Company, a subsidiary of Russian Railways serving long-distance passenger transportation
 Fermentation-produced chymosin
 Finite population correction
 First-order predicate calculus
 First Parish in Cambridge, a church in Massachusetts, United States
 Flagler Palm Coast High School, in Florida, United States
 Flexible purpose corporation
 Certified Flight Paramedic, FP-C Flight Paramedic Certification
 Foreign Policy Centre, a British foreign affairs think-tank
 Formosa Plastics Corp, a Taiwanese plastics company
 Free person of color
 Free Presbyterian Church (disambiguation)
 Fresh Pretty Cure!, a Japanese anime series
 Front Page Challenge, a Canadian television show